Yuri Viktorovich Ryazanov (born September 24, 1970) is a Russian businessman and politician. He is a member of the Federal Council of the all-Russian political party Party of Action and the Vice President of Novoe Sodruzhestvo. He is a member of the board of directors of Rostselmash, Empils and Buhler Industries.

Early life
Ryazanov was born in 1970 in Miass (Chelyabinsk region; USSR) in a family of engineers of the State Rocket Center. In 1993, he graduated from the department of Aerophysics and Space Research of Moscow Institute of Physics and Technology.

Career 
In 1992, he was a co-founder of CJSC Production Association Commonwealth. In conjunction with Konstantin Babkin and Dmitry Udras withdrew Empils (1998) and Rostselmash (2000) plants from the crisis of the 1990s.

Since 2005, he has been Vice President of CJSC Novoe Sodruzhestvo, uniting 20 enterprises located in Rostov Oblast, Moscow, Kazakhstan, Ukraine, Canada and the United States.

He is the publisher of the magazine Up. He chairs the organizing Committee of the international film festival of family cinema Up.

He was the producer of for multiple films, including Rowan waltz (2009), Priest-San (2015),  (2015),  (2017),  (2017), Ginger's Tale (2020), and of the short films I believe in you (2016),No nails (2016), Must not (2017), and line producer of The Flight of the horned Vikings (2018). He acted in Gerasim (2017): under the name "Georgi Vityazev".

He has authored children's books.

Political career
He is one of the founders of the all-Russian political party Party of Action. In 2010 he became a member of the Federal Council of the party.

He is known for sharp criticism of Russia's accession to the World Trade Organization over the terms of Russia's membership.

Personal life
Yury Ryazanov is married and has three sons and one daughter.

References

External links 
 

1970 births
21st-century Russian poets
21st-century Russian politicians
21st-century Russian writers
Living people
Male screenwriters
People from Miass
Russian billionaires
Russian businesspeople
Russian company founders
Russian investors
Russian male poets
Russian Orthodox Christians from Russia
Russian political activists
Russian technology company founders
Moscow Institute of Physics and Technology alumni
21st-century Russian screenwriters
Party of Business politicians